Ethmia cassiopeia is a moth in the family Depressariidae. It is found in the Democratic Republic of Congo.

References

Moths described in 1927
cassiopeia